Frank Garfield Stephens (26 April 1889 – 9 August 1970) was an English amateur cricketer who played first-class cricket for Warwickshire from 1907 to 1912.

On his first-class debut, against Yorkshire in 1907, Stephens top-scored in the second innings with 15 not out as Warwickshire were dismissed for 47. He made his highest score, 144 not out, against Lancashire in 1912, preventing defeat after Warwickshire had trailed by 282 runs on the first innings.

His twin brother, George, captained Warwickshire in 1919. Both brothers played in Warwickshire's first County Championship victory in 1911 and later served on the Warwickshire committee.

References

External links
 Frank Stephens at CricketArchive
 

1889 births
1970 deaths
English cricketers
Warwickshire cricketers